Eduard Ortalla Sacapaño (born 14 February 1980) is a Filipino former professional footballer who played as a goalkeeper. He is currently the goalkeeping coach of Philippines Football League club United City.

Early years
Sacapaño was born in Bago. He started playing football at the age of 13. Sacapaño later joined the West Negros College varsity football team, where he took the role of a goalkeeper. He then joined the Philippine Army and became part of its team that saw action in the United Football League.

Career
In March 2013, to boost Global FC's preparation for the 2013 AFC President's Cup, Sacapaño was sent to the club on loan.

He became part of the Philippine national football team in 2006. He was notable for the national team after playing against the Los Angeles Galaxy and CF Internacional de Madrid.

Honours

Global FC
UFL Division 1 Runner-up: 2013

Philippines
Philippine Peace Cup: 2012, 2013
AFC Challenge Cup Third place: 2012

Individual

Philippine Peace Cup Best Goalkeeper Award: 2012

References

1980 births
Living people
Filipino footballers
Association football goalkeepers
Philippines international footballers
Global Makati F.C. players
Ceres–Negros F.C. players
Sportspeople from Bacolod
Footballers from Negros Occidental